Asavo-Zubovo (Aśaw-Zubov) is a rural locality (a selo) in Kazadayevsky Selsoviet, Sterlitamaksky District, Bashkortostan, Russia. The population was 137 as of 2010. There is 1 street.

Geography 
Asavo-Zubovo is located 14 km north of Sterlitamak (the district's administrative centre) by road. Roshchinsky is the nearest rural locality.

References 

Rural localities in Sterlitamaksky District